The Roy Vue is an apartment building in Seattle, United States. Its red brick facade is ornamented by several typically Tudor elements such as parapeted gables. 

In 2018 plans were announced to demolish the interior of the building and build-over the signature courtyard.

References

External links
 "Save the Roy Vue", an interest group

1924 establishments in Washington (state)
Capitol Hill, Seattle